= Rafi Kureh =

- Location in Iran
- Coordinates: 37°14′33″N 49°00′13″E
- Country: Iran
- Province: Ardabil Province
- Time zone: UTC+3:30 (IRST)
  - Summer (DST): UTC+4:30 (IRDT)

Rafi Kureh is a village in the Ardabil Province of Iran.
